Daniel Vern Speckhard (born June 11, 1959) is an American diplomat and nonprofit executive. Speckhard is the president and CEO of Corus International, an ensemble of faith-based organizations including Lutheran World Relief and IMA World Health,
and is a former United States Ambassador to Greece and Belarus. In addition to his diplomatic and nonprofit service, Speckhard has worked as a non-resident senior fellow at the Brookings Institution and is currently a non-resident senior fellow at the Atlantic Council.

Early life and education
Born in Clintonville, Wisconsin on June 11, 1959, Speckhard received a bachelor's degree, a master's degree in public policy and administration, and a master's degree in economics from the University of Wisconsin–Madison.

Career

Early career
Prior to joining the State Department in 1990, Speckhard worked for the International Affairs Division of the Office of Management and Budget, the Agency for International Development, a staff member in the U.S. Senate, and in state and local government.

Diplomat
From 1990 to 1993, Speckhard served as an advisor and then director of policy and resources for the Deputy Secretary of State, coordinating and overseeing foreign aid funding in support of U.S. policy objectives. He received special recognition for his role in reorienting these programs to meet the new challenges of the post-Cold War era.

Speckhard served from 1993 to 1997 as deputy to the ambassador-at-large for the New Independent States at the State Department in Washington. He was responsible for a broad range of political, security and economic issues facing large parts of the former Soviet Union.

As U.S. Ambassador to Belarus from 1997 to 2000, Speckhard worked closely with the Organization for Security and Cooperation in Europe and the European Union in promoting democratic reform, human rights, and institutional development.

From 2000 to 2003, he was NATO’s deputy assistant secretary general for political affairs, covering political relations with the countries of Eastern Europe, the Balkans, the former Soviet Union, and the Mediterranean. During this period, Speckhard received the NATO Service Medal for his crisis management work. From 2003 to 2005, Speckhard served at the North Atlantic Treaty Organization as director of Policy Planning – responsible for advising and assisting the Secretary General of NATO, senior NATO management, and the North Atlantic Council in addressing strategic issues facing the alliance.

Speckhard served in Iraq from 2005 to 2007, first as the director of the Iraq Reconstruction Management Office, responsible for overseeing the $18.4 billion Iraq Relief and Reconstruction Fund and then as the deputy chief of mission at the U.S. Embassy in Baghdad, Iraq.

Speckhard was sworn in as U.S. Ambassador to Greece on November 7, 2007, and arrived in Athens on November 15, 2007, where he served until 2010.

Banking
From February 1, 2011, until August 19, 2011, Speckhard was non-executive chairman of the Greek Proton Bank.

International development
On April 11, 2014, Lutheran World Relief (LWR) announced that Speckhard was named president and CEO. He began at LWR on July 1, 2014. He has served as a nonresident senior fellow in the Global Economy and Development program at the Brookings Institution, and is currently a nonresident senior fellow in the Future Europe Initiative of the Atlantic Council.

References

External links

Presidential Nomination: Daniel Vern Speckhard

1959 births
Living people
People from Clintonville, Wisconsin
University of Wisconsin–Madison College of Letters and Science alumni
Ambassadors of the United States to Greece
Ambassadors of the United States to Belarus
United States Foreign Service personnel
Robert M. La Follette School of Public Affairs alumni